Alistipes inops is a Gram-negative, non-spore-forming, rod-shaped, obligately anaerobic and non-motile bacterium from the genus of Alistipes which has been isolated from human faeces.

References

External links
Type strain of Alistipes inops at BacDive -  the Bacterial Diversity Metadatabase

Bacteria described in 2015
Bacteroidia